The Salmson B.9 was a French designed, nine-cylinder, water-cooled radial aero engine that was produced under license in Britain. The engine was produced between August 1914 and December 1918. The French version was designated 9B with a slightly increased capacity variant known as the R.9 or 9R. A further variant known as the M.9 or 9M unusually drove the propeller through a 90-degree gear train.

Variants
Salmson B.9 (Salmson 9B)
140 horsepower (104 kW)
Salmson M.9 (Salmson 9M)
120 horsepower (89 kW), 90-degree propeller drive
Salmson R.9 (Salmson 9R)
160 horsepower (119 kW, increased bore to 140 mm.

Applications
Salmson B.9
Farman F.27
Short Admiralty Type 135
Short Type C
Short 830
Voisin LA.S
Salmson M.9 
Blackburn Type L
Breguet U2
Voisin LA
Salmson R.9
Farman F.27

Engines on display
A watercooled, nine-cylinder Salmson engine is on public display at the London Science Museum.

Specifications (B.9)

See also

References

Notes

Bibliography

 Lumsden, Alec. British Piston Engines and their Aircraft. Marlborough, Wiltshire: Airlife Publishing, 2003. .

1910s aircraft piston engines
Salmson aircraft engines
Water-cooled radial engines